The 1957 Brown Bears football team was an American football team that represented Brown University as a member of the Ivy League during the 1957 NCAA University Division football season. 

In their seventh season under head coach Alva Kelley, the Bears compiled a 5–4 record and outscored opponents 154 to 125. Gil Robertshaw was the team captain.  

The Bears' 3–4 conference record tied for fourth in the Ivy League. They were outscored by Ivy opponents, 111 to 100. 

Brown played its home games at Brown Stadium in Providence, Rhode Island.

Schedule

References

Brown
Brown Bears football seasons
Brown Bears football